Shikha Devi Uberoi (born 5 April 1983) is an Indian-American former professional tennis player, who formerly represented India in international tournaments and a former Indian No. 1. After Nirupama Sanjeev, she is also the second Indian female player in history to crack the top 200 rankings by the WTA.

Biography
Uberoi was born to father Mahesh (who was a table-tennis player for India) and mother Madhu in Mumbai, Maharashtra. Her family moved to Princeton, New Jersey when she was an infant. She has one older sister (Diya) and three younger sisters (Neha, Nikita and Nimita). Her four sisters are also tennis players, but of all, Shikha is by far the most successful, and the only one to represent India (the other sisters represent the United States). Shikha is the niece of actor Suresh Oberoi and first cousin of actors Vivek Oberoi and Akshay Oberoi.

She was named the Zee Astitva Athlete of the Year 2007. She was one of the top-10 fastest servers in the world. She earned her bachelor's degree from Princeton University in Anthropology and South Asian Studies. She graduated with high academic standing while winning Princeton's prestigious Kit Harris Memorial Award for Leadership and Ethics.

Uberoi launched her media and lifestyle company, SDU Seva, Inc. As of 2013, she is currently creating and producing international social issue television shows, and is a social entrepreneur. She speaks internationally at various diplomatic conferences on female empowerment through sport. She has recently been invited to sit on the board of directors of the World Economic Forum's "Global Shapers Initiative" for Bhopal. She is also a news and sports presenter, and coaches all levels of tennis and fitness.

Tennis career
Uberoi started competing in the ITF Women's Circuit in 1998. In August 2002, she played in her first WTA Tour-level tournament as a wildcard at the New Haven Open, during the 2002 season. She lost her opening qualifying match to Elena Bovina. She would next compete in a WTA tournament a year later in March 2003, at the Sarasota Clay Court Classic, again losing in the first qualifying round to Tara Snyder. The highlight of 2003 would be her winning her first title in August, where she won a $10k tournament in Harrisonburg, Virginia, with five match wins. Later that same year in November, she lost in first qualifying round of the Advanta Championships of Philadelphia to Anikó Kapros.

Uberoi won her first WTA Tour-level match in 2004, albeit at the qualifying level. She defeated Liza Viplav and Aiko Nakamura, before losing to sister Neha in the qualifying finals of the Hyderabad Open. Two weeks later, she lost in the qualifying first round at the Qatar Ladies Open to Li Ting. Uberoi finally got to compete in the main draw of a professional-level tournament at the Budapest Grand Prix, with qualifying wins over Christiane Hoppmann, Cristina Torrens Valero, and Edina Gallovits; she would lose the round one encounter to Marion Bartoli later in the tournament.

At the 2004 US Open, Uberoi was competing in her first ever Grand Slam tournament as a wildcard into the qualifying draw. Win three wins over Ivana Abramović, Anne Kremer, and Vilmarie Castellvi, she entered the main draw. She then won her first-round match, defeating Saori Obata. She lost to Venus Williams in round two, having led 4–1 in the first set against the multiple Grand Slam champion. During the 2004 season, Shikha won two further (and ultimately her last two) ITF singles titles in Fort Worth and Edmond.

During the Australian swing at the beginning of the 2005 WTA Tour, Uberoi lost in the qualifying stages of the Gold Coast Hardcourts, the Hobart International, and the Australian Open, losing to Yan Zi, Sunitha Rao, and Teryn Ashley, respectively. However, in early February, she won against Olga Savchuk, Yuan Meng, and Tatiana Poutchek back to back to make the main draw of the Pattaya Open in Thailand, but lost to Conchita Martínez in round one. The following week, she received direct entry into the main draw of a WTA event for the first time (at the Hyderabad Open), although she lost her opening match to Melinda Czink in three tight sets. She had somewhat of a decent form at the Indian Wells Open in March, with solid wins over Saori Obata, Ekaterina Bychkova (both in qualifying), and Akiko Morigami (round one). But, she lost her opening qualifying matches to Aiko Nakamura and Angela Haynes at Miami and Charleston, respectively. In May 2005, she lost in the first round of the Rabat Grand Prix to Yan Zi, and also failed to qualify for both the Italian Open and Roland Garros. Uberoi also had poor form on the grass court tournaments, failing to qualify at the Birmingham Classic, as well as Wimbledon. During the North American hardcourt swing, she only managed to compete in one main-draw match, losing to Dally Randriantefy at the Canadian Open. The highlight of her 2005 season was reaching the quarterfinals of the Sunfeast Open in Kolkata (being only the second player representing India to reach a WTA quarterfinal; Sania Mirza was the first one, winning the Hyderabad title earlier that same year). Also in 2005, Shikha reached two WTA Tour doubles finals, partnering sister Neha, one in Kolkata and one in Guangzhou.

In 2006, Uberoi qualified for the Qatar Ladies Open, but lost to María Vento-Kabchi in the first round. She would not have any significant results until the Estoril Open in May, where she won three matches, only to lose to Maret Ani in the first round. The only other (main draw) WTA tournament she competed in that year was the Japan Open, where she was defeated by Vera Dushevina. She did represent her country at the 2006 Asian Games where she defeated Linda Ahmad of Bahrain in round one, but lost in the second round to Zheng Jie of China.

In January 2007, Uberoi was the doubles finalist at the Auckland Open, partnering Hsieh Su-wei. Being awarded a wildcard into the Bangalore International, she lost to Ágnes Szávay. This would be the last time she would compete in a WTA Tour main draw. Following this, Uberoi had limited success on the ITF Circuit, playing irregularly until mid-2011. Her last singles win was in the qualifying draw of the $50k Lexington Challenger, in late July 2010, against He Chun-yan. She played her final singles match in the next tournament she participated in, a year later, at the same tournament in July 2011, losing to Amanda Fink in the first qualifying round. In doubles, at the same Lexington tournament in 2011, she paired with Jennifer Elie to win her final match, before losing in the quarterfinals. Since then, Uberoi has competed in one last doubles tournament, a $25k event in Mumbai in November 2014, where she and partner Rishika Sunkara lost their opening match.

WTA career finals

Doubles: 3 (3 runner-ups)

ITF finals

Singles (3–0)

Doubles (3–3)

References

External links
 
 

1983 births
Living people
Racket sportspeople from Mumbai
Sportswomen from Maharashtra
People from Princeton, New Jersey
Tennis people from New Jersey
American female tennis players
Indian female tennis players
American sportspeople of Indian descent
Indian-American tennis players
Asian Games medalists in tennis
Tennis players at the 2006 Asian Games
Medalists at the 2006 Asian Games
Asian Games silver medalists for India
American expatriates in India
Princeton University alumni
21st-century American women